Blakeley is an unincorporated historic community in Umatilla County, Oregon, United States between Pendleton and Milton-Freewater. It is just north of Oregon Route 11 on Wildhorse Creek. Blakeley was once a station on the Union Pacific Railroad. The station was first named "Eastland" after Robert E. Eastland, who received a patent on land nearby in 1880. The name was later changed to honor William M. Blakley (alternatively spelled "Blakeley" and "Blakely"), an Oregon state representative from 1902–1906, and a wheat grower in the area. The elevation is 1417 ft (432 m) above sea level.

References

Former populated places in Umatilla County, Oregon
Unincorporated communities in Oregon